The 1921 New South Wales Rugby League premiership was the fourteenth season of Australia’s first rugby league football club competition which was based in Sydney. Nine teams from across the city contested the season, with North Sydney being crowned premiers by virtue of finishing the season on top of the League. The 1921 season also saw the St George club enter the competition, replacing the Annandale club, who after thirteen seasons, exited the League.

Season summary
Because the 1921–22 Kangaroo tour of Great Britain departed in mid-July only one series of nine rounds was played, with the second series being devoted to the City Cup. The premiership was decided with no finals on a first-past-the-post basis.

Premiers North Sydney became the second team to go through a season undefeated - seven wins and an 8-8 draw with Easts in round 5. Their brilliant performance earned them their maiden premiership.

University became the third team to have gone through a season winless, as Annandale had done the previous season and in 1918. University’s season yielded eight losses from eight starts, conceding 295 points at an average of 36.88 per match.

The season saw an experiment with referees instead of halfbacks feeding the scrum. Although the experiment was very quickly viewed a dismal failure and abandoned, the amendment was sometimes advocated in later years after scrums became largely uncontested.

Teams
With the addition of St George in place of the recently departed Annandale club, the number of teams in the League remained at nine.
 Balmain, formed on January 23, 1908, at Balmain Town Hall
 Eastern Suburbs, formed on January 24, 1908, at Paddington Town Hall
 Glebe, formed on January 9, 1908
 Newtown, formed on January 14, 1908
 North Sydney, formed on February 7, 1908
 South Sydney, formed on January 17, 1908, at Redfern Town Hall
 St George, formed on November 8, 1920, at Kogarah School of Arts
 Western Suburbs, formed on February 4, 1908
 University, formed in 1919 at Sydney University

Ladder

References

External links
 Rugby League Tables - Notes The World of Rugby League
 Rugby League Tables - Season 1921 The World of Rugby League
 Premiership History and Statistics RL1908
Results: 1921-30 at rabbitohs.com.au

New South Wales Rugby League premiership
NSWRFL season